Busana is a comune (municipality) in the Province of Reggio Emilia in the Italian region Emilia-Romagna, located about  west of Bologna and about  southwest of Reggio Emilia.

Its territory is included in the Appennino Tosco-Emiliano National Park.

References

Cities and towns in Emilia-Romagna